Combined Graduated Level Examination (In short known as 'CGL Exam' or 'CGLE') is an examination conducted by the Staff Selection Commission to recruit Group B and C officers to various posts in top ministries, departments and organisations of Government of India. The Staff Selection Commission was established in 1975.

Prerequisites
Candidates applying for the various posts need to have a bachelor's degree from a recognised university at the time of applying. The age requirements are between 20 and 30 years. The age limits may vary depending on the position applied. For instance, the position for Inspector of Central Bureau of Narcotics which had an age range from 18 to 27 years, was extended to 30 years in September 2018. The application fee for 2017 is Rs. 100. All women candidates and candidates belonging to Scheduled Caste, Scheduled Tribe, Physically Handicapped, and Ex-Servicemen eligible for reservation are exempted from paying application fee.

Structure
The examination has several tiers which are conducted over different days with results posted after each tier. Previous exams also included an interview tier, but following a government order, interviews have been dispensed with for all non-gazetted posts in the central government as of 1 January 2016. A computer proficiency test or a skill test was also added as a tier for some posts. There are four major tiers of examination.

Tier I: Preliminary 
The Tier I exam consists of a written objective multiple-choice exam with four sections, covering the subjects of:
 General Intelligence and Reasoning
 General Awareness
 Quantitative Aptitude
 English Comprehension

The exam was typically scored with maximum 50 Marks per section for a total of 200 Marks. The latest versions of this exam such as with 2018 have been conducted online.

Based on results from Tier I, qualified candidates can then take the Tier II and Tier III exams.

Tier II: Mains Exam 
Also known as the Mains Exam, the Tier II exam consists of written objective multiple-choice exam, in three sections (also called "Papers"), covering the subjects of:
Paper-1
Section-1:
         Module-1:Mathematical Abilities
         Module-2:Reasoning and General Intelligence
Section-2:
         Module-1:English Language and Comprehension
         Module-2:General Awareness
Section-3:
         Module-1:Computer Knowledge Module
         Module-2:Data Entry Speed Test Module
Paper-2
        Statistics
Paper-3
        General Studies(Finance and Economics)

 Most positions required the candidate to take only the first three sections but certain positions require the third or fourth section. The latest versions of this exam such as the 2018 edition have been conducted online.

 Data Entry Speed Test (DEST): candidates enter data at the rate of 2000 key presses in 15 minutes.  This is mainly for positions such as Tax Assistant. (Central Excise & Income Tax)
 Computer Proficiency Test (CPT): covering the topics of word processing, spreadsheets, and making slides.

Other exams
Other exams are required for certain positions. The types included:
 Personality Test / Interview (discontinued starting 2016)
 Physical Endurance Test / Medical Examination for Central Police Organization (CPO)

Logistics
The 2016 exam was held in 44 batches across 96 cities. There were 3.8 million applicants, of which 1.48 million took the Tier 1 exam. 149,319 candidates passed Tier 1, and 35,096 candidates passed Tier 2. The final number of positions for the 2016 exam was estimated to be about 10,661.

Candidates were allowed to view their answer sheets and point out errors in the grading of answers for a fee of Rs. 100 per question.

For the 2017 exam, the SSC said about 3,026,598 candidates filled in the online application, of which 1,543,418 candidates took the exam. 226,229 candidates passed Tier 1, and 47,003 candidates passed Tier 2.

Controversies
On 21 February 2018, it was reported that the screenshots of the question paper of the 2017 SSC Tier 2 exam appeared on social media before the exam began. This led to massive protests. The authorities canceled the exam, and Central Bureau of Investigation conducted an investigation, releasing a First information report that named several entities including employees at Sify Technologies that allegedly participated in the leak. The Tier-III exam for that year was also postponed. SSC CGLE 2018 which was supposed to be held in 2018 got delayed multiple times. CGL 2018 final result was declared in early 2021 after delay of almost 3 years.

Exam delays
Postponements in exam dates and/or results have been a regular occurrence. In addition to the delays in launching the 2017 Tier 1 exams, the 2016 exam final appointments were delayed. The 2014 exam was also delayed and the 2018 Tier 1 exams are being postponed.

See also

 Gazetted Officer (India)
 Junior Science Talent Search Examination
 Services Selection Board
 List of Public service commissions in India

References

Civil service tests in India
Ministry of Personnel, Public Grievances and Pensions